Ashill is a small village and civil parish in Somerset, England, situated  south of Taunton, and three miles north-west of Ilminster in the South Somerset district.  The parish includes the hamlet of Windmill Hill and has a population of 529.

It has a small junior school, a village pub named The Ashill Inn, a village hall and a playing field.

History 

Ashill is mentioned in the Domesday book for its extensive woodland. The manor passed from the de Vaux family to Sir Thomas Moulton by 1317, and then through the Stretche and Beauchamp families to the Spekes who built Jordans as their mansion, which was demolished in the 1960s, although the grotto/summer house (dating from 1828) in the grounds survives. The grotto is on the Heritage at Risk Register due to vandalism despite re-thatching.

Ashill was part of the hundred of Abdick and Bulstone.

Governance

The parish council has responsibility for local issues, including setting an annual precept (local rate) to cover the council's operating costs and producing annual accounts for public scrutiny. The parish council evaluates local planning applications and works with the local police, district council officers, and neighbourhood watch groups on matters of crime, security, and traffic. The parish council's role also includes initiating projects for the maintenance and repair of parish facilities, as well as consulting with the district council on the maintenance, repair, and improvement of highways, drainage, footpaths, public transport, and street cleaning. Conservation matters (including trees and listed buildings) and environmental issues are also the responsibility of the council.

The village falls within the Non-metropolitan district of South Somerset, which was formed on 1 April 1974 under the Local Government Act 1972, having previously been part of Chard Rural District. The district council is responsible for local planning and building control, local roads, council housing, environmental health, markets and fairs, refuse collection and recycling, cemeteries and crematoria, leisure services, parks, and tourism.

Somerset County Council is responsible for running the largest and most expensive local services such as education, social services, libraries, main roads, public transport, policing and fire services, trading standards, waste disposal and strategic planning.

It is also part of the Yeovil county constituency represented in the House of Commons of the Parliament of the United Kingdom. It elects one Member of Parliament (MP) by the first past the post system of election. Prior to Brexit in 2020 it was part of the South West England constituency of the European Parliament.

Church 

The church is named The Church of the Virgin Mary and dates from the 12th or 13th century, with various later alterations. It has been designated by English Heritage as a Grade II* listed building. The old rectory has some 16th-century fragments but was largely rebuilt around 1800.

Places of interest 

 The late 15th-century Rowland's Farm is the home of the Speke family.
 Rowland's Mill is a Hamstone watermill dating from the 17th century.
 18th-century cider house.

References

External links

 

Villages in South Somerset
Civil parishes in Somerset